The Sarjeant Gallery Te Whare o Rehua Whanganui at Pukenamu, Queen's Park Whanganui is currently closed for redevelopment. The temporary premises at Sarjeant on the Quay, 38 Taupo Quay currently house the Sarjeant Collection, and all exhibitions and events. The Sarjeant Gallery is a regional art museum with a collection of international and New Zealand art.

Founding and building

The Sarjeant was built as the result of a bequest to the city by Henry Sarjeant in 1912. Sarjeant bequeathed the money "for the inspiration of ourselves and those who come after us." A competition was held to select an architect for the project; the winner was Dunedin architect Edmund Anscombe, but it is likely the actual design was completed by a young student in his offices names Donald Hosie. The cruciform, neo-classical style gallery was opened in 1919. Four galleries branch off a central space capped with an oculus in a hemispherical dome.

The building is registered with the New Zealand Historic Places Trust (now Heritage New Zealand) as a Category I Historic Place with registration number 167, and has the highest possible listing under the New Zealand Historic Places Trust Act.

Collections

There are more than 8,300 artworks in the gallery's collection, spanning 400 years. Initially focused on 19th and early 20th century British and European art but, given the expansive terms of the will of benefactor Henry Sarjeant, the collection now spans 16th century through to the 21st century. Among the collections are historic and modern works in all media – on paper, sculptures, pottery, ceramics and glass; bronze works; video art; and paintings by contemporary artists and old masters. International artists featured in the collection include Edward Coley Burne-Jones, Domenico Piola, Frank Brangwyn, Bernardino Poccetti, Gaspard Dughet, William Richmond, William Etty, Lelio Orsi, Frederick Goodall, and Augustus John. Among the New Zealand born or based artists featured in the collection are Colin McCahon, Ralph Hotere, Pat Hanly, Peter Nicholls, Charles Frederick Goldie, Gottfried Lindauer and Petrus van der Velden.

The Sarjeant also has a major collection of the works of Whanganui-born painter Edith Collier, and the most significant collection of works by Joan Grehan, also Whanganui-born.

The majority of the collection is accessible online: Explore the Sarjeant Gallery collection

Tylee Cottage Residency

Since 1986, the Sarjeant Gallery has facilitated the Tylee Cottage Residency.

Sarjeant Gallery Redevelopment Project

The Christchurch-based architecture firm Warren and Mahoney won a competition for the redevelopment of the Sarjeant Gallery in 1999. This redevelopment includes seismic strengthening, restoration and the addition of a north-facing extension which will not be visible from the iconic south-facing facade.

In 2014, as fundraising for the redevelopment continued, the entire Sarjeant collection and gallery shifted to new, temporary premises on Taupo Quay, in central Whanganui where the exhibitions program is ongoing.

Leadership
The gallery's first professional Director was Gordon H. Brown, who took the role in 1974 and resigned in 1977. Brown implemented a programme of changing exhibitions and made important contemporary acquisitions for the collection. For most of the Sarjeant's contemporary history, the gallery was led by Brown's successor, Bill Milbank, who joined the organisation in 1975 and served as Director from 1978-2006. The Tylee Cottage Residency programme began during Milbank's tenure, as did the ongoing series of dome installations, which officially began with artist Billy Apple's removal of the sculpture, The Wrestlers in 1979, although there had been earlier installations. Greg Anderson took the role of Director next, remaining for 15 years before departing for a role at Auckland Art Gallery in late 2022. Former Te Uru Director, Andrew Clifford, was appointed at the end of 2022, taking up the role in March 2023.

References

External links 

 

Art museums and galleries in New Zealand
Heritage New Zealand Category 1 historic places in Manawatū-Whanganui
Buildings and structures in Whanganui
Museums in Manawatū-Whanganui
1910s architecture in New Zealand